The El Oro parakeet (Pyrrhura orcesi) is an Endangered species of bird in subfamily Arinae of the family Psittacidae, the African and New World parrots. It is endemic to Ecuador.

Taxonomy and systematics

The El Oro parakeet is monotypic. Its closest relative is believed to be the maroon-tailed parakeet (P. melanura).

Description

Adult males have a mostly green head with a red forehead and lores. Their upperparts are green. Their throat, the sides of their neck, and their breast are green with grayish buff bars giving an indistinct scaly appearance. The rest of their underparts are green with some faint dull reddish on the belly. Their wing is mostly green with red primary coverts; their primaries are blue. Their tail is maroon with a green base and a dusky maroon underside. Their bill is dusky and their iris is dark with bare pinkish skin surrounding it. Females are almost the same as males but with much reduced red on the forehead. Immature birds are similar to adults but with even less red on the head and wing and none on the belly.

Distribution and habitat

The El Oro parakeet is found only on the west slope of the Ecuadoran Andes in Azuay and El Oro provinces.

Behavior

Movement

The El Oro parakeet is not known to have any pattern of movements.

Feeding

The El Oro parakeet feeds on fruit and berries; some known sources are figs (Ficus), Heliocarpus, Hieronyma, and Cecropia. It typically forages in flocks of up to about 15 individuals but flocks as large as 60 have been observed.

Breeding

The El Oro parakeet's breeding season appears to span from March to July. It uses a variety of trees but Dacroide peruviana appears to be preferred. It also uses nest boxes provided by Buenaventura Reserve. El Oro parakeets breed cooperatively, a breeding pair being accompanied by up to six helpers.

Vocalization

The El Oro parakeet's most common call is "a series of grating notes with a rather hoarse quality, e.g. “crreeet crreeet crreeet” " that is given both from a perch and in flight. Perched birds also call with single "chuk" or "krrr" notes, though perched birds are often silent. Members of a flock "call frequently and simultaneously, producing a noisy chattering."

Status

The IUCN originally assessed the El Oro parakeet as Vulneralble but since 2000 has listed it as Endangered. It has a very limited range and an estimated population of fewer than 1000 mature individuals. "Remaining habitat is fragmented, and both range and population are thought to be declining." The Buenaventura Reserve was created in 1999 by Fundación de Conservación Jocotoco to conserve this species and the El Oro tapaculo (Scytalopus robbinsi). About 75% of the El Oro parakeet's population is found there and nearby.

References

Further reading
Schaefer, H. M., and Veronika Schmidt. Final Report El Oro Parakeet Project, Southwestern Ecuador 2002–2003. Rep. Google Docs. Web. 1 May 2010. <https://web.archive.org/web/20110719031618/http://www.fjocotoco.org/pdf/final-report-pyrrhura.pdf>.

El Oro parakeet
Birds of Ecuador
Endemic birds of Ecuador
El Oro parakeet
Taxonomy articles created by Polbot
Fauna of the northwestern Andean montane forests